Wölk or Woelk is a German surname. Notable people with the surname include:

Ekkehard Wölk (born 1967), German pianist and composer
Kevin Wölk (born 1985), German footballer
Lothar Woelk (born 1954), German footballer
Andrzej Wölk (born 1985), Polish footballer, policeman.
Margot Wölk (born 1917), Adolf Hitler's personal food taster

German-language surnames